Valeamare is the Hungarian name for two villages in Romania:

 Valea Mare village, Ceru-Băcăinți Commune, Alba County
 Valea Mare de Criș village, Tomești Commune, Hunedoara County